Courtland is a city in Republic County, Kansas, United States.  As of the 2020 census, the population of the city was 294.

History

The first settlement was made at Courtland in 1885. A post office was opened in Prospect (an extinct town) in 1878, but it was moved to Courtland in 1888. The community was named after Cortland, New York, but may also be named for Courtland, a city near Mankato, Minnesota, which shares the same spelling.

In 1887, Atchison, Topeka and Santa Fe Railway built a branch line from Neva (3 miles west of Strong City) through Courtland to Superior, Nebraska.  In 1996, the Atchison, Topeka and Santa Fe Railway merged with Burlington Northern Railroad and renamed to the current BNSF Railway.  Most locals still refer to this railroad as the "Santa Fe".

Courtland was incorporated as a city in 1892.

Geography
Courtland is located at  (39.782803, -97.897054).

Demographics

2010 census
As of the census of 2010, there were 285 people, 137 households, and 82 families living in the city. The racial makeup of the city was 98.9% White, 0.7% African American, and 0.4% Asian. Hispanic or Latino of any race were 0.4% of the population.

There were 137 households, of which 26.3% had children under the age of 18 living with them, 46.0% were married couples living together, 7.3% had a female householder with no husband present, 6.6% had a male householder with no wife present, and 40.1% were non-families. 34.3% of all households were made up of individuals, and 14.6% had someone living alone who was 65 years of age or older. The average household size was 2.08 and the average family size was 2.66.

The median age in the city was 46.1 years. 22.1% of residents were under the age of 18; 6% were between the ages of 18 and 24; 19.7% were from 25 to 44; 29.8% were from 45 to 64; and 22.5% were 65 years of age or older. The gender makeup of the city was 52.6% male and 47.4% female.

2000 census
As of the census of 2000, there were 334 people, 149 households, and 96 families living in the city. The racial makeup of the city was 98.80% White, 0.30% African American, 0.30% Native American, 0.60% from other races. Hispanic or Latino of any race were 3.89% of the population.

There were 149 households, out of which 28.9% had children under the age of 18 living with them, 57.0% were married couples living together, 3.4% had a female householder with no husband present, and 34.9% were non-families. 32.2% of all households were made up of individuals, and 21.5% had someone living alone who was 65 years of age or older. The average household size was 2.24 and the average family size was 2.84.

In the city, the population was spread out, with 25.1% under the age of 18, 3.9% from 18 to 24, 18.3% from 25 to 44, 23.7% from 45 to 64, and 29.0% who were 65 years of age or older. The median age was 47 years. For every 100 females, there were 100.0 males. For every 100 females age 18 and over, there were 98.4 males.

The median income for a household in the city was $27,188, and the median income for a family was $37,778. Males had a median income of $26,667 versus $13,500 for females. The per capita income for the city was $14,543. About 6.3% of families and 11.3% of the population were below the poverty line, including 12.8% of those under age 18 and 19.1% of those age 65 or over.

Area events

Courtland Fun Day - annual summer celebration held the last Saturday in July annually since 1964.

Education
The community is served by Pike Valley USD 426 public school district.  School unification consolidated Courtland and Scandia schools forming the district. The Pike Valley High School mascot is Panthers.

Prior to school unification, the Courtland High School mascot was Courtland Tigers. The Courtland Tigers won the Kansas State High School boys class B Indoor Track & Field championship in 1961.

References

Further reading

External links

 City of Courtland
 Courtland - Directory of Public Officials
 Courtland city map, KDOT

Cities in Kansas
Cities in Republic County, Kansas